The Sudan Liberal Party may refer to:
Liberal Party (Sudan) founded in 1952 to compete in the 1953 elections
Liberal Party of Sudan founded in September 2008 through a merger of four parties
Sudan Liberal Party, founded in 2003 and in 2008 merged with others into the Liberal Party of Sudan
South Sudan Liberal Party, founded in 2010